Mark Keyworth (19 February 1948 – 23 November 2014) was an English rugby union player who played for Swansea, Aberystwyth, the North Midlands county team, and the national team.

Mark was educated at Ellesmere College, Shropshire for whom he played rugby.  Mark also played rugby for Cirencester Agricultural College whilst completing his farming education there.

References

1948 births
2014 deaths
Aberystwyth RFC players
England international rugby union players
English rugby union players
Rugby union players from Cardigan
Rugby union flankers
Rugby union players from Shropshire
Swansea RFC players